Morton is a city in Scott County, Mississippi, United States. The population was 3,462 at the 2010 census.

Geography
Morton is surrounded by the Bienville National Forest. Roosevelt State Park is southwest of the community.

Demographics

2020 census

As of the 2020 United States Census, there were 3,711 people, 1,006 households, and 893 families residing in the city.

2010 census
As of the 2010 census, there were 3,462 people, 1,133 households, and 797 families residing in the city. The population density was 517.9 people per square mile (200.1/km). There were 1,289 housing units at an average density of 191.7 per square mile (74.1/km). The racial makeup of the city was 44.5% White, 35.9% African American, 0.3% Native American, 0.1% Asian, 0.1% Pacific Islander, 16.8% from other races, and 2.2% from two or more races. Hispanic or Latino were 25.7% (16.1% Mexican, 3.3% Guatemalan, 1.4% Cuban, 1.0% Nicaraguan, 0.8% Argentinean).

There were 1,197 households, out of which 35.1% had children under the age of 18 living with them, 43.3% were married couples living together, 21.5% had a female householder with no husband present, and 28.8% were non-families. 24.5% of all households were made up of individuals, and 10.4% had someone living alone who was 65 years of age or older. The average household size was 2.78 and the average family size was 3.26.

In the city, the population was spread out, with 27.8% under the age of 18, 10.0% from 18 to 24, 26.5% from 25 to 44, 21.2% from 45 to 64, and 14.5% who were 65 years of age or older. The median age was 35 years. For every 100 females, there were 89.3 males. For every 100 females age 18 and over, there were 82.7 males.

The median income for a household in the city was $25,491, and the median income for a family was $31,161. Males had a median income of $26,649 versus $16,731 for females. The per capita income for the city was $12,556. About 18.9% of families and 24.6% of the population were below the poverty line, including 32.5% of those under age 18 and 22.4% of those age 65 or over.

Economy
The main employers are chicken processing plants. The largest poultry plant is owned by Koch Foods Inc.

Education
The City of Morton is served by the Scott County School District.

Notable people
Rhythm and blues singer B Angie B was born and raised in Morton
Taveze Calhoun, NFL defensive back
Deuce McAllister, New Orleans Saints running back, attended Morton High School
Atley Donald, MLB pitcher, was born in Morton

References

External links

Cities in Mississippi
Cities in Scott County, Mississippi